Neobidessodes mjobergi is a carnivorous subterranean water beetle, in the Bidessini tribe of the Dytiscidae family. It was first described in 1922 by Albrecht Zimmermann as Bidessus mjobergi, and reassigned to the genus  of Neobidessodes in 2009 by Hendrich and others. 

It is found in Western Australia, the Northern Territory and Queensland.

The species name honours Eric Mjöberg.

References

Dytiscidae
Beetles of Australia
Beetles described in 1922
Taxa named by Albrecht Zimmermann